Synergy is the second studio album by hard rock band Shaman's Harvest. It was released on April 28, 2002.

Track listing

References

2002 albums
Shaman's Harvest albums